H28 is a national road (H-Highway) in Chernihiv Oblast, Ukraine. It runs north-south and connected Chernihiv with a tri-side border. Before 2017, H28 was numbered as P13.

Main route
Main route and connections to/intersections with other highways in Ukraine.

The road passes through many small populated places, among which the most notable are two former Cossack towns of Chernihiv Regiment Sedniv, a former estate of Lyzohub family, and Horodnia. Another former Cossack town, today is a small village of Kyselivka. Since 2009 in Sedniv exists a historical preserve Lyzohub Estate (Sadyba Lyzohubiv).

During the Soviet occupation, many villages in the region suffered from the Soviet policy of so called "black boards" which contributed to Holodomor.

Intersections
In Chernihiv, the road connects to the major transportation corridor M01. In Kyselivka it intersects the P12 (Chernihiv – Novhorod-Siverskyi). Through Senivka in Belarus the road continues onto Belarusian road P124, and in Russia the continues onto Russian road M13.

See also

 Roads in Ukraine

References

External links
Regional Roads in Ukraine in Russian

Roads in Chernihiv Oblast